Utricularia inthanonensis is a terrestrial lithophytic carnivorous plant that belongs to the genus Utricularia. It is endemic to northern Thailand in Doi Inthanon National Park where it is only known from the type locality. It is closely related to U. garrettii, another species endemic to Thailand, and differs from it in corolla, seed, and bladder morphology. Utricularia inthanonensis can also be found growing with U. striatula. It was first formally described by Piyakaset Suksathan (of the Queen Sirikit Botanic Garden) and John Adrian Naicker Parnell (of Trinity College, Dublin) in 2010 from collections made by Suksathan in 2005 and 2007.

See also 
 List of Utricularia species

References 

inthanonensis
Carnivorous plants of Asia
Endemic flora of Thailand
Plants described in 2010